Michael Tarnat (born 27 October 1969) is a German former professional footballer, currently employed by Bayern Munich as the leader of the U12–U16 youth teams. A left-footed full-back, he  was also employed as a left wingback and occasionally as a defensive midfielder. His nickname is "Tanne", meaning "fir" in English. He ended his career with Hannover 96, having previously played for MSV Duisburg, Karlsruher SC, Bayern Munich and Manchester City. A veteran of 19 caps for Germany, Tarnat also participated in the 1998 FIFA World Cup. He is renowned for his powerful free kicks and similar long-shots with his strong left foot.

Club career

Early years
Born in Hilden, Tarnat started to play football at the club SV Hilden-Nord before starting his professional career in 1990 when he joined MSV Duisburg. He made his Bundesliga debut on 2 August 1991 in Duisburg's home match against VfB Stuttgart and went on to make 58 appearances for the club in the league in the following two seasons, also scoring his first Bundesliga goal in Duisburg's 1–1 draw away against VfB Leipzig on 27 August 1993. He moved to Karlsruher SC in the summer of 1994 and grew into one of the team's stars, alongside Thomas Häßler and Thorsten Fink. His trademark was his super-hard left-footed shot, which made him one of the best free-kick takers of his Bundesliga generation. In three seasons with KSC, Tarnat made 81 Bundesliga appearances and scored seven goals for the club in the league. In 1996, he was called up into the German national team for the first time and made his international debut in Germany's 1998 World Cup qualifier against Armenia on 9 October 1996.

Bayern Munich
In 1997, he got his big break when Bayern Munich bought him along with Fink. He played well on his left flank, good enough to give star left full-back Bixente Lizarazu almost a full season on the bench. In the following seasons, trainer Ottmar Hitzfeld would often play them both, giving Bayern one of the best left flanks in Europe. Tarnat's Bayern career was extremely successful. He was German champion in 1999, 2000, 2001 and 2003, won the DFB-Pokal in 1998, 2000 and 2003 and the UEFA Champions League in 2001. Tarnat also played in the 1999 UEFA Champions League Final in which Bayern lost 2–1 to Manchester United with two stoppage-time goals.

In Bayern Munich's away match against Eintracht Frankfurt in the 1999–2000 Bundesliga season, Tarnat memorably played half an hour in the second half as a goalkeeper. In the match, Oliver Kahn was forced to leave the pitch after sustaining an injury in collision with teammate Samuel Kuffour and his replacement Bernd Dreher was also injured after he spent less than ten minutes on the pitch, allowing Tarnat to come off the bench to take his place between the sticks. Very remarkably, Bayern had trailed 0–1, but scored the equaliser only two minutes after Tarnat entered the match and eventually managed to win 2–1 after Kuffour scored the winning goal in the 80th minute.

Manchester City and Hannover 96
In the late years, however, Tarnat became somewhat injury-prone, which effectively ended his international career in 1998 after 19 caps and caused Bayern to bench him often. In six seasons of playing for Bayern, Tarnat made 122 Bundesliga appearances and scored eight goals for the club in the league. He made a move to Manchester City in 2003, making 32 Premier League appearances and scoring three goals for the club in the league before returning to Germany by signing with Hannover 96 a year later, where he played for the rest of his career. On 17 May 2009, it was announced that he would retire from professional football. He played his last game for Hannover on 29 July 2009 vs Arsenal. In August 2009, Tarnat returned to FC Bayern Munich as a talent scout.

International career
He was also a regular in the Germany national team at the 1998 World Cup finals in France, appearing in four out of five matches played by the team at the tournament before they were surprisingly eliminated by Croatia in the quarterfinals. In the group game against Yugoslavia, his free kick led to Siniša Mihajlović scoring an own goal.

Personal life
Tarnat's son Niklas Tarnat is also a professional footballer, currently playing for Hannover 96.

Career statistics

Club

International

Honours
Karlsruher SC
 DFB-Pokal Runner-up: 1995–96

Bayern Munich
 Bundesliga: 1998–99, 1999–2000, 2000–01, 2002–03
 DFB Pokal: 1997–98, 1999–2000, 2002–03; Runner-up: 1998–99
 DFB Liga-Pokal: 1997, 1998, 1999, 2000
 UEFA Champions League: 2000–01; Runner-up 1998–99
 FIFA Intercontinental Cup: 2001
 UEFA Super Cup Runner-up: 2001

References

External links
 
 
 

1969 births
Living people
Expatriate footballers in England
German expatriate footballers
German footballers
Germany international footballers
German expatriate sportspeople in England
Association football midfielders
Association football fullbacks
MSV Duisburg players
Karlsruher SC players
FC Bayern Munich footballers
Manchester City F.C. players
Premier League players
Hannover 96 players
1998 FIFA World Cup players
FC Bayern Munich non-playing staff
Bundesliga players
2. Bundesliga players
UEFA Champions League winning players
Outfield association footballers who played in goal
West German footballers